Qoljeh Tappeh is a village in Il Teymur Rural District, in the Central District of Bukan County, West Azerbaijan Province, Iran. At the 2006 census, its population was 357, in 47 families.

References 

Populated places in Bukan County